Laurence Banfield (11 November 1889 – 11 September 1979) was an English footballer who played as a left back. He made over 250 Football League appearances in the years before and after the First World War.

Career
Laurie Banfield played locally for Old Mills and Paulton Rovers. Sam Hollis signed Banfield in July 1911 from Paulton Rovers for Bristol City.

Honours
with Bristol City
Football League Third Division South winner: 1922–23
FA Cup semi-finalist 1920

References

1889 births
1979 deaths
People from Paulton
English footballers
Association football fullbacks
English Football League players
Western Football League players
Paulton Rovers F.C. players
Ilfracombe Town F.C. players
Bristol City F.C. players
English football managers
Ilfracombe Town F.C. managers